Adamantinoma (from the Greek word adamantinos, meaning "very hard") is a rare bone cancer, making up less than 1% of all bone cancers. It almost always occurs in the bones of the lower leg and involves both epithelial and osteofibrous tissue.

The condition was first described by Fischer in 1913.

Presentation
Patients typically present with swelling with or without pain. The slow-growing tumor predominantly arises in long bones in a subcortical location (95% in the tibia or fibula).  Most commonly, patients are in their second or third decade, but adamantinoma can occur over a wide age range.

Benign osteofibrous dysplasia may be a precursor of adamantinoma or a regressive phase of adamantinoma.

Histologically, islands of epithelial cells are found in a fibrous stroma. The tumor is typically well-demarcated, osteolytic and eccentric, with cystic zones resembling soap bubbles.

Diagnosis

Diagnosis is on plain radiography, or CT scan

Treatment
Treatment consists of wide resection or amputation.  Metastases are rare at presentation but may occur in up to 30% of patients during the disease course.  Prognosis is excellent, with overall survival of 85% at 10 years, but is lower when wide surgical margins cannot be obtained. This tumor is insensitive to radiation so chemotherapy is not typically used unless the cancer has metastasized to the lungs or other organs.

History
The typically benign odontogenic tumor known as ameloblastoma was first recognized in 1827 by Cusack but did not yet have any designation.  In 1885, this kind of odontogenic neoplasm was designated as an adamantinoma by Malassez and was finally renamed to the modern name ameloblastoma in 1930 by Ivey and Churchill. Some authors still confusingly misuse the term adamantinoma to describe ameloblastomas, although they differ in histology and frequency of malignancy.

References

External links 

Rare cancers
Osseous and chondromatous neoplasia